Ras GTPase-activating protein 3 is an enzyme that in humans is encoded by the RASA3 gene.

The protein encoded by this gene is member of the GAP1 family of GTPase-activating proteins. The gene product stimulates the GTPase activity of normal RAS p21 but not its oncogenic counterpart. Acting as a suppressor of RAS function, the protein enhances the weak intrinsic GTPase activity of RAS proteins resulting in the inactive GDP-bound form of RAS, thereby allowing control of cellular proliferation and differentiation. This family member is an inositol 1,3,4,5-tetrakisphosphate-binding protein, like the closely related RAS p21 protein activator 2. The two family members have distinct pleckstrin-homology domains, with this particular member having a domain consistent with its localization to the plasma membrane.

Interactions
RASA3 has been shown to interact with HCK.

References

Further reading